The 2019–20 season was Göztepe S.K.'s 95th year in existence. In addition to the domestic league, Göztepe S.K. participated in the Turkish Cup.

Squad

Süper Lig

League table

Results summary

Results by round

Matches

References
 

Göztepe S.K. seasons
Turkish football clubs 2019–20 season